is a railway station on the Osaka Metro Midosuji Line and the Keihan Railway Keihan Main Line in Japan.  It is the nearest station to the Osaka City Hall.

Lines
 
  (M17)
 Keihan Electric Railway
 Keihan Main Line

Layout

Osaka Metro Midosuji Line 

The subway station is an island platform with two tracks on the 2nd basement.  Ticket gates are located in the north, the center-north, the center-south and the south on the 1st basement.  The Keihan Main Line is close to the north gates.

Keihan Railway Keihan Main Line

Keihan station has an island platform serving four tracks on the 2nd basement.  Ticket gates are located on the 1st basement, and named in order from the east to west, East Gates 2, East Gates 1, Central Gates, West Gates and West Exit Gates 0. The Osaka Municipal Subway Midosuji Line is close to the West Gates and the West Exit Gates 0.

The following ticket gates are open during the following hours.

East Gates 1 - only on weekday rush-hours (7:30–9:50, 17:10–21:15)
East Gates 2 - only on weekday mornings (7:30–9:50)
West Exit Gates 0 - (7–21 on weekdays and Saturdays, 8–19 on Sundays, Japanese national holidays, obon period and year-change period)

In addition, West Gates are used only for exit till 9 on weekdays.

Establishments around the station

 Osaka City Hall
 Nakanoshima Park
 Ōebashi Station (Keihan Railway Nakanoshima Line)
 the headquarters of Osaka Gas Co., Ltd.
 the headquarters of Nippon Life Insurance Company
 the headquarters of Mizuno Corporation
 Sumitomo Mitsui Banking Corporation Osaka building
 the headquarters of Sumitomo Trust and Banking Co., Ltd.
 Bank of Japan Osaka branch
 The Bank of Tokyo-Mitsubishi UFJ Osaka branch
 the headquarters of Resona Holdings
 Mizuho Bank Osaka branch
 The Museum of Oriental Ceramics, Osaka
 Osaka Suijō Bus Yodoyabashi Pier

Adjacent stations

|-

References

Chūō-ku, Osaka
Railway stations in Japan opened in 1963
Railway stations in Japan opened in 1933
Railway stations in Osaka
Osaka Metro stations